The  are an owarai duo with a long history composed of Tokyo-born  and . Both of them attended  where Ishibashi, the taller of the two, participated in baseball, and Kinashi participated in soccer.

They originated not as a manzai duo, so much as an ippatsu gag and monomane act. During the early 1980s, they became immensely popular with young Japanese audiences, appearing in several television shows, but their popularity exploded with their show The Tunnels' Thanks to Everyone. Many times they absorbed more than 30% of nationwide television viewers, a great feat for any television show. They then turned their attention to creating music, spawning a string of hit singles that also generated massive sales and attention.

Both phrases are still in popular use today. Also, their tendency to use inside jokes that only the show's staff would understand and laugh at created a sur-like response from the audience, inciting nervous laughter from a confused audience, while the staff laughed loudly on-mike.

Interest in the group quickly mellowed in 1990, as Tunnels took a half year vacation from the show, and U-tchan Nan-chan replaced them. They returned later saying, "We are sorry to have laid the burden on U-tchan Nan-chan," but were never really accepted back by the public. As groups such as Downtown and U-tchan Nan-chan became more popular with young audiences, Tunnels changed their focus to talk and interview-related shows.

Recently, they have teamed with DJ Ozma to "produce" the group Yazima Beauty Salon, who the three found in America. In reality, Ozma and the Tunnels are the members of Yazima Beauty Salon, cross-dressing and performing in character as Margaret Camelia Yazima (Kinashi) and Strawberry Camelia Yazima (Ishibashi).

References

External links 
  
とんねるずのみなさんのおかげでした/Tunnels no Minasan no okage deshita Official site 

Japanese comedy duos
Japanese boy bands